Nicolae Bărbășescu (born 19 September 1940) is a Romanian biathlete. He competed at the 1964 Winter Olympics and the 1968 Winter Olympics.

References

1940 births
Living people
Romanian male biathletes
Olympic biathletes of Romania
Biathletes at the 1964 Winter Olympics
Biathletes at the 1968 Winter Olympics
Sportspeople from Brașov